Ellis Rastelli (born 18 January 1975) is an Italian former professional racing cyclist. He rode in four editions of the Giro d'Italia.

Major results

1998
1st Stage 5 Regio-Tour
1999
1st Stage 2 Euskal Bizikleta
7th Overall GP Kranj
2001
1st Stage 1 Giro d'Italia
3rd Giro del Friuli
2004
8th Overall Post Danmark Rundt

References

External links
 

1975 births
Living people
Italian male cyclists
Cyclists from Emilia-Romagna